Michael John Sanderson (born 20 March 1983) is a British-Dutch wildlife filmmaker.

He started his career in Bristol on the award-winning BBC series Smalltalk Diaries (2008) as cameraman.

One of his first independent projects as a Producer and Director of Photography (2009-2010) was a film about the Eurasian wolf in Chernobyl (Ukraine and Belarus) for the television channels ORF/NDR/PBS/BBC. During this project, he pioneered filming in Ultra High Definition (4K resolution) and was one of the first to build and use multi-rotor video drones for aerial images for EFP and wildlife film productions.

In the Netherlands, Sanderson's cinematography can be found in De Nieuwe Wildernis (2013), which was number one in the Dutch box office and is still the biggest Dutch nature film for cinema ever; in Holland: Natuur in de Delta (2015) for which Sanderson filmed the closing sequences and the specialist macro using lenses he built himself; and De Wilde Stad (2018) which he filmed, in high speed, the scene of a peregrine falcon hunting and the emotional scene of ducklings jumping for the first time from their rooftop nest to the canals of Amsterdam.

Sanderson produced multiple wildlife documentaries for NHK which include The Paternal Bond: Barbary Macaques (2015) which is about the Barbary Macaque in Morocco's Atlas Mountains; Pyrenees Mountain (2017), which is about the endangered Bearded Vulture in Spain; and the Japanese re-versioning of A Wild Fox Life (2019).

Sanderson has filmed extensively in Latin America for Planet Earth II, BBC Natural World Jungle Animal Hospital and for his independent Ateles Films production, which was aired worldwide including Nat Geo WILD and Arte, called Return of the Spider Monkeys (2016) narrated by Hayley Atwell and follows the life of an orphaned spider monkey called Infinity after she is released back into the jungle of Guatemala. For this film, Sanderson learned how to climb into the canopy alongside the spider monkeys of the Mayan jungle to film their intimate lives from a tree top perspective.

Recent work includes, A Wild Fox Life (2019) which was shot in the Netherlands and follows the life of a red fox that lives in the Oostvaardersplassen nature reserve on the reclaimed polder province of Flevoland.

Sanderson founded Ateles Films in 2013, where he also serves as a executive producer and cinematographer for their wildlife film productions, together with his business partner.

Education
He studied Broadcast Systems Engineering (1st class BSc) at Solent University in Southampton and an MA in Documentary Filmmaking at Royal Holloway, University of London

Filmography

Films

Awards

Lectures
Michael Sanderson has been invited as a guest lecture to several events: 
2013 for CineMec at “Master Class De Nieuwe Wildernis”;
2014 for Institute Beeld & Geluid at “Inspiration Day – Leren met Natuurbeelden”;
2015 for University of Porto for “Seminar – Open Class“;
2017 for NHL Stenden University for the event “Guest lecture by: Michael Sanderson“; for "Nederlandse Filmacademie Amsterdamse Hogeschool voor de Kunsten" for “BA Cinematography" and also during the Drone World Expo on the panel "Aerial Artistry: Exceptional Film and Television” in Silicon Valley.

Books
 The Drone Camera Handbook, Aurum Press Lta, 2017. .

References

External links
 Official Website
 

1983 births
British documentary filmmakers
Dutch documentary filmmakers
Dutch photographers
Living people
Nature photographers